The 2016–17 season was Granada CF's sixth season in La Liga following their promotion at the end of the 2010–11 season. Granada were relegated from La Liga, finishing 20th, and returned to the Segunda División for the first time since 2011. Granada also competed in the Copa del Rey, being knocked out in the Round of 32 by Osasuna.

Season Events
Prior to the start of the season, Granada appointed Paco Jémez to replace José González on 20 June 2016 Jémez was sacked on 28 September 2016, being replaced by Lucas Alcaraz on 3 October 2016. Alcaraz was then fired on 10 April 2017, with Tony Adams taking charge until the end of the season.

Squad

Out on loan

Transfer

Summer

In:

Out:

Winter

In:

Out:

Competitions

La Liga

Table

Results summary

Results by matchday

Results

Copa del Rey

Squad statistics

Appearances and goals

|-
|colspan="14"|Players away from Granada on loan:

|-
|colspan="14"|Players who left Granada during the season:

|}

Goalscorers

Disciplinary record

References

External links
Official website 
Official website 
Futbolme team profile 
BDFutbol team profile
Unofficial website 

Granada CF seasons
Granada
Granada